Ilchester Nunnery, in Ilchester, Somerset, England, was founded around 1217-1220 as the "White Hall Hospital of the Holy Trinity", (Latin: Alba Aula, French: Blanche Halle/Blanchesale) after the gift of a house and other property by William "The Dane" of Sock Dennis manor, Ilchester (Norman-French: Le Deneis etc., Latinised to Dacus (the adjectival form of Dacia being mediaeval Latin for Denmark) modernised to "Dennis"). From this family was probably descended the influential Denys family of Devon, (arms; three Danish battle axes) seated at Orleigh in the 16th century. By 1281, it had been converted into an Augustinian nunnery.

In the early 14th century concerns were raised about the management of the nunnery and the poverty of the nuns. The building was expanded in 1370. By 1463 the nunnery had been dissolved and its chapel become a free chapel, which itself was dissolved in 1548.

A ruined building still existed in 1791 but the stone was then used to build the nearby Castle Farm.

Prioresses
Alice Atteyerde, 1315
Alice de Chilthorne, 1316
Cecilia de Draycote, 1325
Mary, 1370
Matilda, occurs 1377
Margaret, otherwise Marjory, 1377
Christina, 1423

Further reading
Thomas Hugo, Whitehall Hospital, Nunnery, Free Chapel, 12th-18th Century (1867) (Ilchester and District Occasional Papers (Guernsey) 52, 45-84)
James Stevens Cox, Whitehall hospital, nunnery, free chapel, Ilchester (J. S. Cox, Ilchester Historical Monographs no. 6, 1950)

References

Monasteries in Somerset
1463 disestablishments
Augustinian nunneries in England
1220 establishments in England
15th-century disestablishments in England
Christian monasteries established in the 13th century